Abstraction of transport/protocol connectivity is the ability to connect to various components or services through multiple protocols without code change or addition, via change to a standard configuration file.  Connectivity abstraction may be achieved through a service transport protocol implementation.

Sources
 elemenope User Guide

See also
 elemenope

External links
elemenope home page
elemenope User Guide

Software architecture